Tenasillahe Island is an island in the Columbia River Estuary portion of the Columbia River in Clatsop County, Oregon. It is separated from the mainland and the unincorporated community of Clifton, Oregon by the Clifton Channel, and from nearby Welch Island by the Red Slough.

The island was visited by the Lewis and Clark Expedition, and Tenasillahe and Welch were known as the "Marshy Islands".

The entire island is part of the Julia Butler Hansen Refuge for the Columbian White-tailed Deer.

Etymology
The name "Tenasillahe Island" is tautological, in that "Tenasillahe" means "island" in the Chinook language.

References

Islands of the Columbia River in Oregon
Landforms of Clatsop County, Oregon
Uninhabited islands of Oregon